The Stockton Kings are an American professional basketball team of the NBA G League based in Stockton, California, and are affiliated with the Sacramento Kings. The Kings play their home games at the Stockton Arena and compete in the G League's Western Conference Pacific Division.

The team began play during the 2008–09 season in Reno, Nevada, as the Reno Bighorns. They moved to Stockton and changed their name in 2018.

History

Reno Bighorns

The Reno Bighorns began play in the 2008–09 season with their home games at the Reno Events Center. Their namesake was the desert bighorn sheep, which is the state animal of Nevada. The Bighorns were primarily affiliated with the Sacramento Kings, which has been with the team since its inception in 2008. Reno also had affiliations with the New York Knicks (2008–2009), Orlando Magic (2009–2010), Golden State Warriors (2010–2011), Atlanta Hawks (2011–2012), Memphis Grizzlies (2011–2013), and the Utah Jazz (2012–2013).

During the 2014–15 season the Bighorns led the NBA D-League in scoring and also in call-ups to the NBA with seven. The performance of the team and players like Brady Heslip, Tajuan Porter, and Sim Bhullar garnered media attention in not only the Reno area but also on a national scale with national outlets like The Dan Patrick Show and CBS' The Late Late Show  putting a spotlight on the team. Head coach David Arseneault Jr. and his offense, called "The System" were profiled by The Guardian in late February 2015 in an article that put a spotlight on the coach's innovative game plan that he helped to develop with his father at Grinnell College.

On October 20, 2016, the Bighorns were purchased by their parent club, the Sacramento Kings, after being affiliated with the team since its inaugural season. With the purchase, the Bighorns became the fifteenth D-League team to become directly owned by a parent club. The team slightly changed its logo the following season, changing the color scheme to match that of their parent team and adding a crown over the I to match it as well. The team moved after the 2017–18 season.

Stockton Kings
On April 9, 2018, the Sacramento Kings revealed that they planned to move the club to Stockton, California, to play in the Stockton Arena pending league approval. On April 17, the lease for the use of the arena was approved and the new team name was revealed as the Stockton Kings. The Kings announced their first head coach in Stockton as former Northern Arizona Suns' head coach, Tyrone Ellis on August 13.

Ellis led the team to postseason appearance following the 2018–19 season, but the following season was curtailed by the onset of the COVID-19 pandemic while the Kings were in first place in the Pacific Division. Ellis then left the team in 2020 and the Sacramento Kings chose to not have their affiliate participate in the abbreviated single-site 2020–21 NBA G League season. On May 27, 2021, the Sacramento Kings appointed their assistant and player development coach, Bobby Jackson, as the next head coach of the Stockton team.

Season-by-season results

Current roster

Head coaches

Notable players
Below are a selection of players who have donned a Reno Bighorns or Stockton Kings uniform and in what year they played.

2008–09:
 Patrick Ewing Jr.
 Donté Greene
 Gerry McNamara

2009–10:
 Mo Charlo
 Eric Devendorf
 Yaroslav Korolev
 D. J. Strawberry

2010–11:
 Nick Fazekas
 Danny Green
 Jeremy Lin
 Steve Novak
 Patrick O'Bryant
 Bobby Simmons
 Salim Stoudamire
 Hassan Whiteside

2011–12:
 Blake Ahearn
 Andre Emmett
 David Harrison
 Damon Jones
 Tyler Honeycutt
 Josh Selby
 Antoine Wright

2012–13:
 Keyon Dooling
 Tajuan Porter
 Ralph Sampson III
 Garrett Temple
 Tony Wroten

2013–14:
 DeQuan Jones
 Ray McCallum Jr.
 Mikki Moore
 Royce White

2014–15:
 Sim Bhullar
 Jordan Hamilton
 Brady Heslip
 Quincy Miller
 David Stockton
 David Wear

2015–16:
 Erick Green
 Vince Hunter
 Ricky Ledo
 Sundiata Gaines
 David Stockton

2016–17:
 Lamar Patterson
 Gary Neal
 Malachi Richardson
 Isaiah Cousins

NBA affiliates

Reno Bighorns 
 Atlanta Hawks (2011–2012)
 Golden State Warriors (2010–2011)
 Memphis Grizzlies (2011–2013)
 New York Knicks (2008–2009)
 Orlando Magic (2009–2010)
 Sacramento Kings (2008–2018)
 Utah Jazz (2012–2013)

Stockton Kings
 Sacramento Kings (2018–present)

References

External links
 

 
Basketball teams established in 2008
2008 establishments in California
Basketball teams in California